Witold Bieńkowski, code-name Wencki (1906–1965), was a Polish politician, publicist and leader of the Catholic underground organization called Front for a Reborn Poland (Front Odrodzenia Polski, F.O.P.) during World War II, as well as member of the Provisional Committee to Aid Jews, Żegota, and a permanent representative of the Delegation for Poland of the Polish Government-in-Exile.

Bieńkowski was a Deputy to the Polish parliament (Sejm) from 1947 to 1952. He served as editor-in-chief of the Catholic weekly Dziś i Jutro (pl) (Today and Tomorrow) between 1945 and 1947.

Notes

References
 Ryszard Bosakowski Ostatnie słowo — powojenne listy Witolda Bieńkowskiego do jego dawnych współpracowników z Rady Pomocy Żydom „Żegota” Karta nr 52
 Janusz Marszalec, "Morderstwo na Makowieckich i Widerszalu. Stara sprawa, nowe pytania, nowe wątpliwości." Zagłada Żydów r. II (2006), vol. 2. "Witold Bieńkowski i Władysław Jamontt byli to zasłużeni i dzielni konspiratorzy, a jednocześnie ludzie o dużych ambicjach politycznych."

1906 births
1965 deaths
Members of the Polish Sejm 1947–1952
Żegota members